Mukunda Manikya (d. 1739) was the Maharaja of Tripura from 1729 to 1739.

Life
Originally named Chandramani Thakur, he was the youngest of the four surviving sons of Maharaja Rama Manikya. Each of his elder brothers had successively ruled Tripura; under Ratna II's rule, Chandramani had been sent as a hostage to the Mughal viceregal court at Murshidabad, while during the reigns of Mahendra and Dharma II, he was appointed Barathakur and Yuvraj respectively.

When he succeeded Dharma in 1729, Chandramani assumed the regnal name Mukunda Manikya. He proved to be a pious monarch, donating lands to Brahmins and Kshatriyas. He attempted to maintain cordial relations with the Mughals, sending his son Panch Cowrie Thakur as a hostage and informing on a plot to kill the Mughal Faujdar at Udaipur by his cousin Rudramani.

However, in 1739, he was overthrown by the Mughals due to failing to provide Tripura's annual tribute of five elephants. Udaipur was raided and Mukunda, alongside his sons Bhadramani, Krishnamoni and nephew Gangadhar, were arrested. Unable to bear this humiliation, he poisoned himself, with his queen performing sati in his funeral pyre. He was succeeded by Rudramani (afterward known as Joy Manikya II), who was chosen over Mukunda's sons after he drove the Mughals out of Udaipur.

Notes

References

Kings of Tripura
History of Tripura
Dethroned monarchs
1739 deaths
18th-century suicides
Suicides in India